The Monastery's Hunter is a 1935 German historical drama film directed by Max Obal and starring Friedrich Ulmer, Paul Richter, and Josef Eichheim. It was based on an 1892 novel of the same title by Ludwig Ganghofer.

The film's sets were designed by the art director Carl Ludwig Kirmse and Hans Kuhnert.

Cast

See also
 The Monastery's Hunter (1920 film)
 The Monastery's Hunter (1953 film)

References

Bibliography

External links 
 

1935 films
1930s historical drama films
German historical drama films
Films of Nazi Germany
1930s German-language films
Films directed by Max Obal
Films based on German novels
Films based on works by Ludwig Ganghofer
Films about hunters
Remakes of German films
Films set in Bavaria
Films set in the Alps
Films set in the 14th century
UFA GmbH films
German black-and-white films
1935 drama films
1930s German films